Jaźwiny may refer to the following places in Poland:
Jaźwiny, Lower Silesian Voivodeship (south-west Poland)
Jaźwiny, Lublin Voivodeship (east Poland)
Jaźwiny, Łódź Voivodeship (central Poland)
Jaźwiny, Subcarpathian Voivodeship (south-east Poland)
Jaźwiny, Gmina Borowie in Masovian Voivodeship (east-central Poland)
Jaźwiny, Gmina Pilawa in Masovian Voivodeship (east-central Poland)
Jaźwiny, Przasnysz County in Masovian Voivodeship (east-central Poland)
Jaźwiny, Sierpc County in Masovian Voivodeship (east-central Poland)
Jaźwiny, Konin County in Greater Poland Voivodeship (west-central Poland)
Jaźwiny, Krotoszyn County in Greater Poland Voivodeship (west-central Poland)
Jaźwiny, Ostrzeszów County in Greater Poland Voivodeship (west-central Poland)
Jaźwiny, Silesian Voivodeship (south Poland)
Jaźwiny, Choszczno County in West Pomeranian Voivodeship (north-west Poland)
Jaźwiny, Świdwin County in West Pomeranian Voivodeship (north-west Poland)